= N'Gadé Nana Hadiza Noma Kaka =

Nigerien politician and diplomat

- Born: Niger
- Occupation: Politician

N'Gadé Nana Hadiza Noma Kaka is a politician in Niger.

In 1997, N'Gadé was a founding member of the Alliance for Democracy and Progress (RDP-Jama’a) party led by Hamid Algabid.

In early 2011, N'Gadé was elected to the Dogondoutchi municipal council.

In April 2011, she became Minister for Vocational Training and Employment in the government of Mahamadou Issoufou.

In May 2017, President Issoufou appointed N'Gadé as Niger's ambassador to Italy. She also became Niger's Permanent Representative to the Food and Agriculture Organization of the United Nations, the International Fund for Agricultural Development, and the United Nations World Food Program. After the MPN-Kiishin Kassa left the government coalition, she was dismissed as ambassador in July 2018.

In December 2020 she was elected as national deputy. She is now the vice-president of the Foreign Affairs and Cooperation Committee within the National Assembly of Niger.
